The 2009 WSBL season was the 21st season of the Women's State Basketball League (SBL). The regular season began on Friday 13 March and ended on Saturday 18 July. The finals began on Friday 24 July and ended on Friday 21 August, when the Willetton Tigers defeated the Mandurah Magic in the WSBL Grand Final.

Regular season
The regular season began on Friday 13 March and ended on Saturday 18 July after 19 rounds of competition.

Standings

Finals
The finals began on Friday 24 July and ended on Friday 21 August with the WSBL Grand Final.

Bracket

Awards

Player of the Week

Statistics leaders

Regular season
 Most Valuable Player: Brooke Hiddlestone (Perth Redbacks)
 Coach of the Year: Glenn Ellis (Perry Lakes Hawks)
 Most Improved Player: Courtney Hargreaves (Willetton Tigers)
 All-Star Five:
 PG: Kate Malpass (Willetton Tigers)
 SG: Natalie Young (Lakeside Lightning)
 SF: Deanna Smith (Perry Lakes Hawks)
 PF: Ashley Gilmore (Willetton Tigers)
 C: Shelly Boston (Mandurah Magic)

Finals
 Grand Final MVP: Ashley Gilmore (Willetton Tigers)

References

External links
 March Player & Coach of the Month
 April Player & Coach of the Month
 May Player & Coach of the Month
 June Player & Coach of the Month
 July Player & Coach of the Month

2009
2008–09 in Australian basketball
2009–10 in Australian basketball